Pirttilampi is a medium-sized lake in Finland. It is located in Central Finland, to the north of  Multia.

See also 
 List of lakes in Finland

References 

Lakes of Multia